Bishop Garrigan High School is a private, Roman Catholic high school in Algona, Iowa.  It is located in the Roman Catholic Diocese of Sioux City.

Background
The school is named after Bishop Phillip Joseph Garrigan, the 1st Bishop of the Diocese of Sioux City.  The school was opened in  1959 to serve as a regional high school for 5 parishes.

Athletics
The Golden Bears participate in the Top of Iowa Conference in the following sports:
Football
 1985 Class 2A State Champions
Cross Country
Volleyball
Basketball
Girls’ class 1A state champions 2022
Bowling
Wrestling
Golf
 Girls' 8-time State Champions (2004, 2005, 2006, 2007, 2009, 2011, 2012, 2019)
 Boys' 11-time State Champions (1975, 1976, 1977, 1978, 1979, 1982, 1984, 2010, 2012, 2014, 2015)
Tennis
Track and Field
Baseball
Softball

Notable alumni
 Brad Nelson, former MLB player, (Milwaukee Brewers)

References

External links
 Official website
 Student-run website

Catholic secondary schools in Iowa
Schools in Kossuth County, Iowa
Educational institutions established in 1959
1959 establishments in Iowa